Prasophyllum laxum, commonly known as the lax leek orchid, is a species of orchid endemic to a small region of South Australia. It has a single tubular leaf and up to twenty pale green, tan and lilac-coloured flowers. It was first collected in the 1960s in a location known as the Hundred of Koppio on the Eyre Peninsula but was not described until 2008 from a new collection in 2004.

Description
The flowers are pale green on the inside, tan-coloured on the outside and as with others in the genus, are inverted so that the labellum is above the column rather than below it. The lateral sepals are a similar size to the dorsal sepal, linear to lance-shaped and free from each other. There is a green, channelled callus in the centre of the labellum. Flowering occurs in late September and October but the flowers are short-lived.

Taxonomy and naming
Prasophyllum laxum was first formally described in 2008 by Robert John Bates and the description was published in Journal of the Adelaide Botanic Gardens from a specimen collected near Wanilla. The specific epithet (laxum) is a Latin word meaning "loose" or "slack" referring to the loosely erect leaf and flowering stem.

Distribution and habitat
The lax leek orchid is only known from a single hill between Koppio and Wanilla on the Eyre Peninsula. It grows in sparse woodland.

Conservation
Prasophyllum laxum is listed as "Critically Endangered" under the Commonwealth Government Environment Protection and Biodiversity Conservation Act 1999 (EPBC) Act. The main threats to the population are habitat degradation by livestock and rabbits and from potential mining developments.

References

External links 
 

laxum
Flora of South Australia
Endemic orchids of Australia
Plants described in 2008